Deanna Raybourn (born June 17, 1968)  is an American author of historical fiction and historical mysteries.

Biography 
Raybourn was born in Fort Worth, Texas, but now lives in Williamsburg, Virginia.  She graduated from the University of Texas at San Antonio where she majored in English and History.

Her first published novel, Silent in the Grave, was nominated for the Agatha Award for best new mystery of 2007. Set in Victorian era England, the acclaimed series has been optioned as a UK television series by Free@Last TV.

Bibliography

Lady Julia Grey mysteries 
 Silent in the Grave, 2007 (hardcover , mass market )
 Silent in the Sanctuary, 2008 (paperback , mass market )
 Silent on the Moor, 2009 (paperback , mass market )
 Dark Road to Darjeeling, 2010 (paperback )
 The Dark Enquiry, 2011 (paperback )
 Silent Night, 2012 (paperback )
 "Midsummer Night" novella, 2013 (e-book )
 "Twelfth Night" novella, 2014 (e-book )
 "Bonfire Night" novella, 2014 (e-book )

Veronica Speedwell mysteries 
 A Curious Beginning, 2015 (hardcover )
 A Perilous Undertaking, 2017 (hardcover )
 A Treacherous Curse, 2018 (hardcover )
 A Dangerous Collaboration, 2019 (hardcover )
 A Murderous Relation, 2020 (hardcover )
 An Unexpected Peril, 2021 (hardcover )

Other fiction 
 The Dead Travel Fast, 2010 (paperback )
 Far in the Wilds novella prequel, 2013 (e-book )
 A Spear of Summer Grass, 2013 (paperback )
 "Whisper of Jasmine" novella prequel, 2014 (e-book )
 City of Jasmine, 2014 (paperback )
 Night of a Thousand Stars, 2014 (paperback )
 Killers of a Certain Age, 2022 (hardback )

Nonfiction 
 chapter in Scribbling Women and the Real-Life Romance Heroes Who Love Them, 2014 (paperback )
 contribution to The Mystery Writers of America Cookbook, 2015 (hardcover )

References

External links
 Official Website
 Interview with Bookreporter.com
 Interview with For Books' Sake

1968 births
21st-century American novelists
American mystery writers
American women novelists
Living people
People from Fort Worth, Texas
People from Williamsburg, Virginia
University of Texas at San Antonio alumni
Women mystery writers
21st-century American women writers
RITA Award winners
Women romantic fiction writers
Novelists from Texas
Novelists from Virginia